The Department of State Development, Infrastructure, Local Government and Planning, formerly known as the Department of State Development, Tourism and Innovation, is the ministerial department of the Queensland Government responsible for economic strategy, industry stimulation, and infrastructure, local government and planning in Queensland. The department is led by the Minister for  State Development, Infrastructure, Local Government and Planning, currently Steven Miles (politician), who is supported by the Assistant Minister for Local Government, Nikki Boyd. As with many departments of the Queensland Government, State Development, Manufacturing, Infrastructure and Planning is headquartered at 1 William Street, Brisbane.

References

External links
 

State Development, Tourism and Innovation
Queensland